According to the data displayed by Electrica Furnizare SA in August 2020 (source www.electricafurnizare.ro), the structure of electricity production of Romania in 2019 was provided by:

1. High-carbon energy sources: 38.85%, as follows
22.89% – coal
13.95% – natural gas
0.01% – naphtha
2.00% – other conventional sources

2. Low-carbon sources: 61.13%, as follows
26.75% – hydro-energy
18.98% – nuclear
12.09% – wind power
0.68% – biomass
2.62% – solar energy
0.01% – other renewable sources

Hydroelectric power

Romania has an estimated total usable hydropower of 36,000 GWh per year.

Wind power

Solar power

Nuclear power

Romania placed a heavy emphasis on nuclear power generation. The country's first nuclear power plant, the Cernavodă Number One located near Cernavodă, opened in 1993. Two reactors were operational in 2007 when atomic power generation was an estimated 21,158 million kilowatts, or 23.1 percent of total electric power.

To cover the increasing energy needs of its population and ensure the continued raising of its living standard, Romania plans several nuclear power plants. Nuclear power proposals were presented as early as in the 1990s, but plans were repeatedly canceled even after bids were made by interested manufacturers because of high costs and safety concerns.

Besides the nuclear power plant in Cernavodă, which consists of two nuclear reactors, the Government has recently announced that it plans to build another nuclear power plant which would most likely be located near one of the major rivers in Transylvania. The new nuclear power plant would consist of two or four nuclear reactors and would have a total output of 2,400 MW. The feasibility studies will be ready by mid-2009.

Romania has always chosen CANDU nuclear reactors because they use natural unenriched uranium which is cheap and available locally and because they can be refueled online.

References

Industry in Romania
Electric power in Romania